Bartonella tribocorum is a bacterium. As with other Bartonella species, it can cause disease in animals.

This particular species was first isolated from the blood of wild rats. It is distinguished by its trypsin-like activity, the absence of the ability to hydrolyse proline and tributyrin, its 16S rRNA and citrate synthase gene sequences. its type strain is IBS 506T(CIP 105476T).

References

External links
Bartonella-Associated Infections – CDC
Bartonella species - List of Prokaryotic names with Standing in Nomenclature
UniProt entry
Type strain of Bartonella tribocorum at BacDive -  the Bacterial Diversity Metadatabase

Bartonellaceae
Bacteria described in 1998